Hawley Independent School District is a public school district based in Hawley, Texas (USA).

The district has three campuses - Hawley High (Grades 9-12), Hawley Middle (Grades 6-8), and Hawley Elementary (Grades PK-5).

The Bearcats won the 1995 Class AAA and 1997 Class AA state softball championships. UIL Class AA 2022 Football State Champs 

In 2009, the school district was rated "recognized" by the Texas Education Agency.

References

External links
Hawley ISD

School districts in Jones County, Texas
School districts in Abilene, Texas